Sandeep Nayak (born 7 June 1976) is an Indian surgical oncologist based in Bangalore, India, known as the pioneer of robotic thyroidectomy and Minimally Invasive Neck Dissection in India. He is the Director and the Head of Department of surgical oncology at Fortis Hospital, Bangalore. Nayak was recipient of the Times Health Excellence Award for 2018 by The Times of India. Nayak is the member of Royal College of Surgeons of Edinburgh and American Society of Clinical Oncology. He has previously held the position of the assistant professor at Kidwai Memorial Institute of Oncology from 2012 to 2017. Nayak has been constantly ranked among the top oncologists in India

Biography
Nayak was born in 1976, in Kannur, Kerala. He attended Kasturba Medical College, Mangalore where he graduated in medicine in 1999. He received his postgraduate degree in General surgery in 2006 from Calicut Medical College, Kozhikode. Nayak completed his postgraduate training in surgical oncology in 2010 from Chittaranjan National Cancer Institute, Kolkata. He has received Diplomate of National Board from National Board of Examinations in General Surgery and Surgical Oncology in the years 2006 and 2010 respectively. Nayak received fellowship in laparoscopic and robotic oncology in 2011 from Galaxy Care Laparoscopy Institute, Pune. He also has international visiting fellowship in surgical oncology from Detroit Medical College as well as Detroit (USA) Fellowship for Surgical Oncology Award.

In the year 2006, Nayak received membership of Royal College of Surgeons of Edinburgh. He also have lifetime membership of Association of Surgeons of India and Indian Association of Surgical Oncology. In 2007, Nayak received grant from Indian Council of Medical Research for his contribution to medical field and significant scientific works. Later in 2007, he was awarded with the executive membership of American Society of Clinical Oncology. Between 2012 and 2017, he also worked as an assistant professor at Kidwai Memorial Institute of Oncology. Nayak has worked with Ministry of Health and Family Welfare on various cancer projects of Medical Council of India. He has also published multiple Scientific papers and academic journals on Robotic Thyroidectomy, Minimally Invasive Neck Dissection and Modified Video Endoscopic Inguinal Lymphadenectomy. Nayak has demonstrated robotic and laparoscopic surgeries at multiple national and international conferences. He is also the founder of MACS clinic in Bangalore where he is the Chief surgical oncologist. He also a visiting consultant at Sekgoma Memorial Hospital, Serowe & other hospitals in Botswana.

In 2013, Nayak was awarded with Global Excellence Award at International Conference on Innovations in Biotech and Medicine in Bangalore, India. In 2016, he received Pampanagowda Video Award for Minimally Invasive Neck Dissection (MIND) video at Karnataka State Chapter of Association of Surgeons of India, Shivamogga. In early 2019, Nayak received Times Excellence 2018 Award from The Times Group and was recognized as one of the best surgical oncologists in India.

References

External links

Living people
Indian oncologists
Indian medical writers
Indian medical researchers
20th-century Indian medical doctors
1976 births